Gao Shiyan (born 22 January 1996) is a Chinese basketball player for Shandong Heroes and the Chinese 3x3 national team.

He represented China at the 2020 Summer Olympics.

References

1996 births
Living people
3x3 basketball players at the 2020 Summer Olympics
Chinese men's basketball players
Chinese men's 3x3 basketball players
Olympic 3x3 basketball players of China
Point guards
Shandong Hi-Speed Kirin players
Sportspeople from Dandong